Centrolene lynchi, also known as Lynch's giant glass frog, Lynch's glassfrog, and the Tandayapa giant glass frog, is a species of frog in the family Centrolenidae. It is found in the Risaralda Department and Nariño Department on the Cordillera Occidental of Colombia and on the western Andes in the Pichincha, Cotopaxi, and Santo Domingo de los Tsáchilas Provinces, Ecuador. It is named after , the herpetologist who collected the first specimens of this species.

Description
Dorsum is yellowish-greenish with tiny whitish tubercles and black spots.

Habitat and conservation
It requires forest vegetation overhanging water. It has greatly declined in Ecuador, likely because of changing climate, but it is also threatened by habitat loss, alien species, pollution, and chytridiomycosis. It is present in Reserve Las Gralarias and Reserva Estacion Experimental La Favorita, Ecuador.

References

lynchi
Amphibians of the Andes
Amphibians of Colombia
Amphibians of Ecuador
Taxonomy articles created by Polbot
Amphibians described in 1980
Taxa named by William Edward Duellman